Andrew John Holmes (15 October 1959 – 24 October 2010) was a British rower.

Biography
Holmes was born in Uxbridge, Greater London, and was educated at Latymer Upper School in Hammersmith, west London, where he was coached by Olympic rowing silver medallist Jim Clark. After leaving school, he rowed for Kingston Rowing Club and then Leander Club. At the age of 19, he won the Thames Challenge Cup at Henley Royal Regatta.

He rowed twice in the Olympic Games (in 1984 and 1988) with Sir Steve Redgrave. He was a gold medalist in the men's coxed four in 1984 and in the men's coxless pair in 1988, when he also took bronze in the coxed pair. He also rowed for England in the 1986 Commonwealth Games in Edinburgh, Scotland. winning the coxed four and the coxless pair competitions.,

He retired from rowing in 1990 and severed most contacts with the sport. His daughter only discovered her father's gold-medal-winning pedigree when reading about him in a book at school.

He died in London in 2010 after contracting Weil's disease, a severe form of leptospirosis, which results from contact with urine from infected animals or ingesting water contaminated with urine from infected animals.

References

External links 
 
 Obituary in The Guardian
 Andy Holmes interview by Nick Greenslade in The Observer newspaper, 5 March 2006
 

1959 births
2010 deaths
English male rowers
British male rowers
Olympic rowers of Great Britain
Rowers at the 1984 Summer Olympics
Rowers at the 1988 Summer Olympics
English Olympic medallists
Olympic gold medallists for Great Britain
Olympic bronze medallists for Great Britain
Rowers at the 1986 Commonwealth Games
Commonwealth Games gold medallists for England
People educated at Latymer Upper School
Members of the Order of the British Empire
Infectious disease deaths in England
Olympic medalists in rowing
Members of Leander Club
World Rowing Championships medalists for Great Britain
Medalists at the 1988 Summer Olympics
Medalists at the 1984 Summer Olympics
Commonwealth Games medallists in rowing
Medallists at the 1986 Commonwealth Games